Hendrick Cakin (born 6 January 1992) is a French professional footballer, who plays as a right-back for Saint-Brice FC.

Professional career
A youth academy product of Toulouse FC, Cakin was let go in his final academy year and found himself without a club. After a year of trialing with different teams, he found himself at Vannes in the Championnat National. Unfortunately, he heavily damaged his knee and after surgery spent another year out of action. He came back to football with the reserve side of FC Nantes, and after a successful season moved to Stade de Reims on 28 June 2017. Cakin made his professional debut for Reims in a 1–0 Coupe de la Ligue win over Football Bourg-en-Bresse Péronnas 01 on 8 August 2017, at the age of 25.

Cakin made his league debut for Reims in a 3–0 Ligue 2 win over Paris FC on 14 April 2018. Cakin helped Stade de Reims win the 2017–18 Ligue 2, helping promote them to the Ligue 1 for the 2018–19 season.

In February 2020, Cakin joined French amateur club Saint-Brice FC.

Personal life
Cakin was born in Sarcelles and is of Guadeloupean and Martiniquais descent.

Honours
Reims
 Ligue 2 (1): 2017–18

References

External links
 
 
 
 Stade de Reims Profile

1992 births
Living people
People from Sarcelles
Association football defenders
French footballers
French people of Martiniquais descent
French people of Guadeloupean descent
Stade de Reims players
Vannes OC players
Ligue 2 players
Championnat National players
Footballers from Val-d'Oise